Lost Kisses is a 1945 Argentine film directed by Mario Soffici and starring María Duval and Miguel Faust Rocha.

Cast
María Duval
Miguel Faust Rocha
Alberto Bello
Alita Román
Héctor Coire
Elina Colomer
Homero Cárpena
Juana Sujo
Ángel Walk
Luis Otero

References

External links
 

1945 films
1940s Spanish-language films
Argentine black-and-white films
Films directed by Mario Soffici
Argentine films based on plays
1940s Argentine films